Parliamentary elections are scheduled to be held in Lithuania by 6 October 2024, with a second round two weeks thereafter.

Electoral system

The Seimas has 141 members, elected to a four-year term in parallel voting, with 71 members elected in single-seat constituencies and 70 members elected by proportional representation. The voting in the elections is open to all citizens of Lithuania who are at least 18 years old.

Parliament members in the 71 single-seat constituencies are elected in a majority vote, with a run-off held within 15 days, if necessary. The remaining 70 seats are allocated to the participating political parties using the largest remainder method. Parties normally need to receive at least 5% (7% for multi-party electoral lists) of the votes to be eligible for a seat. Candidates take the seats allocated to their parties based on the preference lists submitted before the election and adjusted by preference votes given by the voters.

Changes to the constitution and new electoral code
After passing amendment of Constitution's article № 56 in April 2022, to be eligible for election, candidates must be at least 21 years old on the election day, not under allegiance to a foreign state and permanently reside in Lithuania, while previously, candidates needed to be at least 25 years old on the election day. Persons serving or due to serve a sentence imposed by the court 65 days before the election are not eligible. Also, judges, citizens performing military service, and servicemen of professional military service and officials of statutory institutions and establishments may not stand for election. In addition, a person who has been removed from office through impeachment may be elected after 10 year period after impeachment.

On 23 June 2022 the Electoral Code was passed. The Code replaced various elections' acts and introduced several changes to the parliamentary elections. Firstly, it gave possibility to establish more than one worldwide constituency. Secondly, it removed a ban of political parties' agitation on Saturdays (e. g. one day prior elections).

Impeached politicians that will be eligible for reelection

Opinion polls

Parliamentary election poll results are listed in the table below in reverse chronological order. The highest percentage figure in each poll is displayed in bold, and its background is shaded in the leading party's colour. The "Lead" column shows the percentage point difference between the two parties with the highest figures.

Notes

References

Lithuania
Parliamentary elections in Lithuania
Lithuania